Marcillé is a commune in the Deux-Sèvres department in western France. It was established on 1 January 2019 by merger of the former communes of Saint-Génard (the seat) and Pouffonds.

See also
Communes of the Deux-Sèvres department

References

Communes of Deux-Sèvres
States and territories established in 2019